1958 is a Norwegian 1980 drama film directed by Oddvar Bull Tuhus, starring Rune Dybedahl and Cecilie Holter. It takes place in the year 1958, and deals with a group of teenagers in Sinsen, Oslo.

External links 

 
 1958 at Filmweb.no

1980 films
1980 drama films
Films set in 1958
Films directed by Oddvar Bull Tuhus
Norwegian drama films